Jan Gerrit Stoeten Pérez (born 10 April 1986), known as Gerrit, is a Spanish footballer who plays for Juventud de Torremolinos CF as a defensive midfielder.

Club career
Born in Torremolinos, Province of Málaga to a Dutch father and a Spanish mother, Gerrit spent the vast majority of his career in his country in the Segunda División B or lower, for example playing two years with Málaga CF's reserves. He was relegated from that league in 2007, and met the same fate with Mérida UD at the end of the 2008–09 season.
 
On 14 January 2010, Gerrit moved abroad and signed a contract with MFK Košice. He scored his only goal for the Slovak club on 24 April in a 2–0 home win against FK Senica, and featured regularly throughout the campaign (12 starts, 11 games complete) as the team finished in 11th position, barely avoiding Super Liga relegation.

In the summer, Gerrit returned to Spain and its lower leagues, splitting 2010–11 with AD Cerro de Reyes – again being relegated from the third tier – and amateurs Juventud de Torremolinos CF. He continued to compete in the third and fourth divisions the following seasons, representing UD Marbella, Unión Estepona CF and CD El Palo.

On 23 July 2014, Gerrit signed a 1+1 deal with Segunda División side CD Numancia. He made his official debut on 31 August, starting in a 2–1 away loss to Real Betis, and totalled 15 appearances across the season, scoring to open a 1–1 home draw with CD Leganés on 26 October.

Gerrit then returned to division three, going on to have spells at Marbella, San Fernando CD, CD Ebro and CF Talavera de la Reina.

References

External links

1986 births
Living people
People from Torremolinos
Spanish people of Dutch descent
Sportspeople from the Province of Málaga
Spanish footballers
Footballers from Andalusia
Association football midfielders
Segunda División players
Segunda División B players
Tercera División players
Segunda Federación players
Tercera Federación players
UD Fuengirola Los Boliches players
Atlético Malagueño players
Mérida UD footballers
CD Guijuelo footballers
Marbella FC players
CD El Palo players
CD Numancia players
San Fernando CD players
CD Ebro players
CF Talavera de la Reina players
Slovak Super Liga players
FC VSS Košice players
Spanish expatriate footballers
Expatriate footballers in Slovakia
Spanish expatriate sportspeople in Slovakia